Sports Center station is an underground metro station of Line 3 in Ningbo, Zhejiang, China. It situates on the crossing of Zhongxing Road and Jingjia Road. It's opened on June 30, 2019.

Exits 

Sports Center station has 3 exits.

References 

Railway stations in Zhejiang
Railway stations in China opened in 2019
Ningbo Rail Transit stations